Le Sexe qui parle is a 1975 French adult film by Claude Mulot. It was the first exclusive hardcore feature film produced and released in France to meet international success, and has been called a cult film. In 1977, Mulot directed the sequel Le Sexe qui parle II, which starts with the "infection" passed by Eric to a prostitute.

Cultural background
The film is an example of a significant tradition in literature and art of talking vaginas, dating back to the ancient folklore motif of the vagina loquens, or "talking cunt". These tales usually involve vaginas talking due to the effect of magic or charms, and often admitting to their unchastity. Talking female genitals feature in the Ozark folktale The magic walking stick, are an early theme in French literature, most notably in Les bijoux indiscrets and the 13th century fabliau Le Chevalier qui faisoit parler les cons et les culs, and the theme continues with The Vagina Monologues.

Plot
Joëlle (Pénélope Lamour) is a beautiful executive at an advertising company who is married to Eric (Jean-Loup Philippe). Her vagina is infected with a mysterious affliction, ostensibly after she is seduced by an attractive blonde girl, and begins to talk and lead her to indecent sexual acts. However, it is soon revealed that her problems root from her sexual hardships and obsessions as an adolescent. In the finale, she has sex with Eric and passes the "infection" to his penis.

Cast
Pénélope Lamour: Joëlle
Jean-Loup Philippe (as Nils Hortzs): Eric
Sylvia Bourdon: Barbara, Joëlle's aunt
Béatrice Harnois: Young Joëlle
Ellen Earl: Martine, the psychiatrist
Vicky Messica: Richard, the reporter

USA release
The film was exported to the United States with the title Pussy Talk and started a period of French porn chic in America, followed soon by films such as Candy’s Candy (Candice Candy) and Kinky Ladies of Bourbon Street (Mes Nuits avec Alice, Pénélope, Arnold, Maude et Richard) in 1976.

References

External links

Pussy Talk: Le Sexe Qui Parle A review of the film
UK release poster featuring Suzy Mandel

French pornographic films
1975 films
1970s pornographic films